Route 485, or Highway 485, can refer to:

Canada
Manitoba Provincial Road 485
New Brunswick Route 485

Ireland
 R485 regional road

Japan
 Japan National Route 485

United States
  Interstate 485 (North Carolina)
  Interstate 485 (Georgia) (proposed)
  County Road 485 (Hernando County, Florida)
  Maryland Route 485
  Mississippi Highway 485
  Nevada State Route 485 (former)
  New Mexico State Road 485
  Puerto Rico Highway 485
 Texas:
  Farm to Market Road 485
  Texas State Highway Loop 485